Karl Ringel (born 30 September 1932) is a German former footballer who played internationally for both Saarland and West Germany.

References

1932 births
Living people
Saar footballers
German footballers
Association football forwards
Saarland international footballers
Germany international footballers
Dual internationalists (football)
SpVgg Greuther Fürth players
1. FC Saarbrücken players
Bundesliga players
Borussia Neunkirchen players
Saarland B international footballers
Sportspeople from Fürth
Footballers from Bavaria